Samuel Tweedy (March 8, 1776 – July 1, 1868) was a United States representative from Connecticut.

Born at Nine Partners, New York in 1776, he later moved to Danbury, Connecticut. He was a member of the Connecticut House of Representatives in 1818, 1820, and 1824 and also served in the Connecticut Senate 1826–1828.

Tweedy held many local offices before being elected as an Anti-Jacksonian to the Twenty-third Congress (March 4, 1833 – March 3, 1835). He died in Danbury, Connecticut, aged 92. He was buried in Wooster Cemetery.

References

1776 births
1868 deaths
Connecticut state senators
Members of the Connecticut House of Representatives
Politicians from Danbury, Connecticut
People from Millbrook, New York
19th-century American politicians
National Republican Party members of the United States House of Representatives from Connecticut